Yellow lady's-slipper may refer to any of three yellow orchids from the genus Cypripedium:

Cypripedium calceolus, native to Eurasia
Cypripedium parviflorum, native to North America
Cypripedium flavum, native to China